"Holla Holla" is the first of three promotional singles from Akon's third studio album Freedom. The song features guest vocals from American singer/rapper T-Pain. The single was released as a digital download on iTunes on November 25, 2008, however, was on to the internet on November 17, 2008. The song peaked at #19 on the Bubbling Under Hot 100 Singles chart on December 1, 2008. The song was not released on any physical formats.

Track listing
 "Holla Holla" (Feat. T-Pain) - 3:00

Charts

References

2008 singles
Akon songs
T-Pain songs
Song recordings produced by Akon
Universal Motown Records singles
2008 songs
Songs written by Akon
Songs written by T-Pain